Samurai Shodown, known in Japan as  is a fighting game series by SNK. The series began in 1993 and is known for being one of the earliest in the genre with a primary focus on weapon-based combat.

Plot
The stories in the series take place in 18th-century Japan, during the Sakoku or seclusion period of Japan (the first four games run across 1788 and 1789) with great artistic license so that foreign-born characters (including some from places that did not exist as such in 1788) and fictional monsters can also be part of the story. The plot of each game is quite different, but they circle a central group of characters and a region in Japan.

Samurai Shodown consequently portrays snippets of the Japanese culture and language internationally with little edits. For instance, unlike most fighting games made in Japan, the characters in the series (including the announcer) generally speak only in Japanese, with dialects ranging from archaic formalities and theatricalism to modern-day slang, something that has been preserved for overseas releases. Win quotes and other cut scenes provide subtitles in several languages, including but not limited to English, Portuguese, and German. Much of the music includes traditional Japanese instruments (predominantly the shakuhachi, shamisen, koto and taiko) and later enka. Several characters are loosely based on real figures from Japanese history.

Development
There are two main artists responsible for the character designs and illustrations. For the early games (Part 1 to 4), the characters are created and illustrated by Eiji Shiroi. His illustrations featured a distinctive, traditional Japanese calligraphy style. While he continues to design for a few of the later games, they are illustrated by another artist named Senri Kita until the fifth title.

The Samurai Shodown games are most famous for their "Rage" (怒) gauge, a meter that only increases as a player receives damage, and which when fully activated has numerous effects depending on game. Earlier games also have a referee in the background, officiating the match.

Characters
Over the course of years since the first game, the Samurai Shodown games (excluding spin-offs) have come to feature over 80 playable warriors. The most famous among them include Haohmaru and Nakoruru, who are both considered the series' flagship characters. Characters directly inspired from historical figures and keeping their names, like Hattori Hanzō and Yagyū Jūbei, are present as well.

Games
Main series in bold.

Adaptations
A television special (later dubbed a motion picture for international release)  loosely based on the first game aired in Japan in 1994. An English adaptation was produced by ADV Films, on VHS in 1995 and on DVD in 2005. The plot means to reenact the events of Samurai Shodown (1993 video game), but the characters’ roles highly deviated from their original source. One of such bizarre changes made was switching Amakusa's gender from male to female. Another questionable change was the inclusion of the “Seven Holy Warriors”, skilled warriors who were resurrected to specifically fight Ambrosia, which is an idea never mentioned in any other continuity.

Several manga adaptations of Samurai Spirits were produced in Japan. One of them, titled , written by Kyoichi Nanatsuki and illustrated by Yuki Miyoshi, was serialized in the Weekly Shonen Sunday in 1994. It was later adapted into English under the simplified titled Samurai Shodown by Viz Media in 1996, where it was serialized in the short-lived Game On! USA magazine and concluded in Animerica. The story is meant to be a prequel to Samurai Shodown II, establishing an original character, Yui Minbunosuke Shosetsu, as the main antagonist. Game characters Haohmaru, Nakoruru, Hanzo, Charlotte, and Genan remain the focal characters to the plot. They often interacted with several original characters in the story; the most prominent perhaps is the Koga kunoichi, Nagiri, who believed Haohmaru had killed her father during his travels and sought to avenge him.

The first anime OVA, the two-part Spirits 2: Asura Zanmaeden, serves as a preface to the events of Samurai Shodown 64: Warriors Rage. Character designs were done by Aoi Nanase, a longtime fan of SNK. Unlike most game-based anime, the voices were supplied by the same actors as in the game. It is relatively obscure, never having been released in the U.S., and the prospect of licensing is dim at best, as it offers no introduction to any of the characters, assuming (not unreasonably) that anyone watching it is likely to be familiar with the series and its cast already. The story mainly revolves on Nakoruru and her humanistic ideals: she believes that anyone with a heart has the right to live peacefully. Shiki, though apparently free from Yuga's influence, is recognized as a threat for the sorcerer's return and it was through Nakoruru's reasonings that previously saved her life from Haohmaru. Nakoruru finds her and then struggles to peacefully defend her from her pursuers, which include Haohmaru, Galford, and Asura. Though torn because of her morals and pacifistic nature, Nakoruru eventually agrees to draw her blade and fight for those who need protecting. Despite being wounded in his final skirmish with Nakoruru, Asura stabs Shiki and they both sink into a portal to the underworld. Making peace with her blood-thirsty alter ego, the Ainu priestess leaves Kamui Kotan, hoping to find news of Shiki's safety.

The second 30-minute OVA, Nakoruru ~Ano hito kara no okurimono~ (OVA), centers around the Nakoruru ADV game, again using Nakoruru as the main heroine. Character designs were done by Yasuomi Umetsu, who is best known for his work in Mezzo Forte and Kite. The events of the story are meant to take place during the time of peace between the first and second games of the series. The story introduces her childhood friends, Yamtamu and Manari, along with her younger sister, Rimururu, and the relentless enigma, Rera. Nakoruru, though glad that there is serenity, experiences several premonitions of devastation and is haunted by the thought of further bloodshed. The climax of the episode has Nakoruru protecting a deer from a rock slide, implied to be caused by evil entities. For undisclosed reasons, the OVA never released another episode and the story remains unfinished.

In 2006, Sabertooth Games released a Samurai Shodown V collectible card game set along with The King of Fighters 2006 for its Universal Fighting System (UFS) collectible card game. Featured character starter decks were also released for Haohmaru and Ukyo Tachibana. STG staff favorites from the Samurai Shodown side tend to favor towards characters Nakoruru and Hanzo Hattori.

See also
The Last Blade
Neo Geo Battle Coliseum
SNK vs. Capcom

Notes

References

External links
Samurai Shodown official website
An archive of the Samurai Shodown old official website
Samurai Spirits 1-4 at NBC Museum of SNK Playmore

 
ADV Films
Kabuki
Video games about ninja
Fighting games
Fighting video games by series
SNK franchises
SNK games
SNK Playmore games
Video games about samurai
Video game franchises
Video game franchises introduced in 1993